Marco Masini (born 18 September 1964 in Florence), is an Italian singer-songwriter, musician and pianist.  

As of 2021, he has released 11 studio albums, 12 compilations, and 3 live albums.

Early years

Marco Masini was born in the city of Florence, in the region of Tuscany, on 18 September 1964. His mother, Anna Maria, sang and played piano, and was an elementary school teacher before she quit the profession to have a life at home with the family. His father, Giancarlo, worked as a representative of hair products.

When Marco was three years old he received a toy piano as a Christmas present. The little boy showed an instant interest in music and soon he began attending music classes.

During high school he created, along with friends, a music group called Errata Corrige. Meanwhile, his lack of interest in studying made him leave high school when he was 16, which caused problems within his family.

For a time, Masini worked with his father as a representative. In 1980 the family opened a bar in Florence. The fights between Marco and his father increased, causing his mother worry and heartache.  A few years later, her husband was forced to sell the bar after she was found to have cancer. Marco left to serve in the army (military aircraft in Florence), and only one day after his return on 22 August 1984, his mother died, to the deep sadness of Marco, who always regretted the fact that he could not be close to her in her last moments.

In his early years of his career he met the record producer Giancarlo Bigazzi who introduced the young musician to the music business, as a collaborator with artists like Raf and Umberto Tozzi. Eventually, in 1990 he participated in the 40th edition of popular Sanremo Festival with one of his signature songs, Disperato, and won first prize as new artist of the year.

Fame and Consecration

After winning third place, now among the main competitors, in the 1991 edition of Sanremo Festival with Perché lo fai (a controversial song about an addicted young woman), Masini, now an emerging star, released his second album, Malinconoia (a composite word coined by the artist indicating a mixture of melancholy and boredom, in Italian malinconia and noia), that became a big hit in the Italian charts, despite the somber mood of most of the record. The Malinconoia music video, taped during a concert at Palaeur in Rome, won first prize in the category "Best live video" during the 1991 edition of Riminicinema festival.  The title track was presented during the popular summer music competition Festivalbar in the long playing records category, and was awarded first prize.

In 1993 the album T'innamorerai was released.  The record created the basis for the international success of Masini. The song that introduces the LP, Vaffanculo (figuratively fuck off), generated controversies and was banned by most radio and television networks. In an interview for the newspaper Corriere della Sera, Masini claimed that the v-word was dedicated to "the liars and who call me 'prophet of the depression'" and the song contained also some harsh verses directed to the record labels and their policies.

In the meantime, Marco became an international sensation. With a style in both music and lyrics that synthesized his diverse musical influences, Marco opened a new path in Italian music and popular culture. The album T'innamorerai became a huge hit, with over a million copies sold worldwide.

In 1995 (January), the fourth album was released, Il Cielo della Vergine in Italy, Switzerland, Belgium, the Netherlands, Germany and the Spanish version (El Cielo de Virgo) in Spain and Latin America. For this album he was criticized again, this time because of two songs Bella Stronza ("Beautiful Bitch") and Principessa ("Princess"), both very direct and explicit.

In 1996 he published L'Amore Sia Con Te, a compilation of his greatest hits, with the new song that gave title to the album and Meglio Solo, an old song, released originally as the B-side of the single Disperato. This collection was also released in Spanish speaking countries as Mi amor allí estará, presenting a slightly different tracklist. During the summer, the tour called L'amore Sia Con Te occurred.

In 1997, fellow singer-songwriter Enrico Ruggeri called him to sing La Gente di Cuore, included in the Ruggeri's album Domani è un altro giorno.

After nearly four years of silence, on 12 November 1998, the Scimmie ("Monkeys") album was released by Ma label, founded by himself, Mario Manzani and Marco Poggione. This new album was a major turning point in production, on which he presented himself to the public with a new look: white hair and beard. But the greatest change was the separation from Bigazzi, Marco's old teacher, who had marked the beginning of his musical career. The disc is a harder rock and the lyrics are generally less sentimental but more airtight. With Scimmie, Marco said he wanted to recover the music from the 1970s that he loved and was back in fashion: the views of the critics were strangely positive, but not public opinion, which decreed the album's commercial failure.

He's an atheist, though he somewhat recognizes the "importance of religion" when a person is in trouble.

He has been engaged to Romina Contiero from 2001 to 2005.

He participated at the Sanremo Music Festival 2020 with the song Il confronto.

Discography

Studio albums 

 1990 – Marco Masini
 1991 – Malinconoia
 1993 – T'innamorerai
 1995 – Il cielo della vergine
 1998 – Scimmie
 2000 – Raccontami di te
 2001 – Uscita di sicurezza
 2005 – Il giardino delle api
 2009 – L'Italia...e altre storie
 2011 – Niente d'importante
 2017 – Spostato di un secondo

Live albums 

 2004 – Masini live 2004
 2010 – Un palco lungo... 20 anni!
 2017 – Marco Masini – In concerto

Compilation albums 

 1996 – L'amore sia con te 
 2003 – .. il mio cammino
 2004 – 'Masini
 2006 – Tozzi Masini
 2013 – La mia storia...piano e voce 
 2015 – Cronologia
 2020 – Masini+1 30th Anniversary

Singles 

 1988 – Uomini / Bugie
 1990 – Disperato
 1990 – Ci vorrebbe il mare
 1991 – Perché lo fai
 1991 – Ti vorrei
 1991 – Malinconoia
 1993 – Vaffanculo
 1993 – T'innamorerai
 1993 – La libertà
 1995 – Bella stronza
 1995 – Principessa
 1995 – Cuccioli
 1995 – Il cielo della vergine
 1996 – L'amore sia con te
 1998 – Scimmie
 1999 – Fino a tutta la vita che c'è
 1999 – Lungomare
 1999 – Il giorno di Natale (Il giorno più banale)
 2000 – Raccontami di te
 2000 – Protagonista
 2000 – Ancóra vita è
 2001 – Lasciaminonmilasciare ("Leavemedon'tleaveme")
 2001 – Il bellissimo mestiere
 2001 – Vai male a scuola]]
 2003 – Generation – feat. Donald D
 2003 – Io non ti sposerò
 2004 – L'uomo volante
 2004 – E ti amo
 2005 – Nel mondo dei sogni
 2005 – Il giardino delle api
 2005 – Tutto quello che ho di te
 2005 – Rimani così
 2006 – Maledetta amica mia
 2006 – Cosa rimane (a Marco) – only for the fan club; written and performed by Andrea Amati in 2002
 2006 – Come si fa...? (with Umberto Tozzi)
 2007 – Anima italiana (with Umberto Tozzi)
 2007 – Arrivederci per lei (with Umberto Tozzi)
 2009 – L'Italia
 2009 – Com'è bella la vita
 2009 – Lontano dai tuoi angeli
 2011 – Niente d'importante
 2011 – Non ti amo più
 2012 – Colpevole
 2013 – Io ti volevo
 2015 – Che giorno è
 2015 – Non è vero che l'amore cambia il mondo
 2017 – Spostato di un secondo
 2017 – Tu non esisti
 2017 – Signor tenente (cover version of Giorgio Faletti)
 2020 – Il confronto
 2020 – T'innamorerai (feat. Francesco Renga); auto-cover of the 1993 homonymous song
2020 – La parte chiara

Guest appearances 

 1988 – Dal tuo sguardo in poi (with Rosita Celentano)
 1997 – La gente di cuore (with Enrico Ruggeri)
 1997 – Ci vorrebbe il mare (with Montserrat Caballé) – (in Friends for Life)
2005 – Voglia di libertà (in ... a Pierangelo Bertoli)
 2009 – Nel blu, dipinto di blu (with Nazionale Italiana Cantanti) – (in L'opportunità)
 2009 – La canzone del sole (with Nazionale Italiana Cantanti) – (in L'opportunità)
 2009 – Uno su mille (with Nazionale Italiana Cantanti) – (in L'opportunità)
 2009 – La forza della vita (with Nazionale Italiana Cantanti) – (in L'opportunità)
 2009 – Si può dare di più (with Nazionale Italiana Cantanti) – (in L'opportunità)
 2010 – Donna a-o volante (with Buio Pesto) – (in Pesto)
 2010 – Dicono così (with Massimo Alessi)
 2016 – Il rumore che fa (with Raige)
 2017 – Va*******o (with Grido) – (in Segnali di fumo)
 2018 – Io non ti sposerò (Remix) (with Calibro 40)
 2018 – Sesto piano (with Zibba) – (in Le cose)
 2018 – Chi fermerà la musica (with Dodi Battaglia) – (in Dodi Day)
 2018 – Pensiero (with Dodi Battaglia) – (in Dodi Day)

Others 

 2013 – Una parte di te (for R101's Stile libero)

Books 

 1991 – Marco Masini - Il piviere
 1995 – Per rabbia e per amore
 2011 – questi nostri 20 anni interminabili
 2022 - L'altalena. La mia storia

References

External links
Official website

1964 births
Living people
Musicians from Florence
Italian male singer-songwriters
Italian singer-songwriters
Sanremo Music Festival winners
Sanremo Music Festival winners of the newcomers section